Apo or APO may refer to:

People 
 Abdullah Öcalan (born 1949), a founding member of  Kurdistan Workers' Party (PKK)
 Apo Avedissian (born 1990), Armenian-American artist

Music 
 ABS-CBN Philharmonic Orchestra
 Aldworth Philharmonic Orchestra, the orchestra of Reading Blue Coat School
 APO Hiking Society, a Filipino singing group
 Armenian Philharmonic Orchestra
 Auckland Philharmonia Orchestra

Places 
 Apache Point Observatory, an observatory in the Sacramento Mountains in Sunspot, New Mexico, United States
 Apo-eup, an administrative division (eup) in Gimcheon, Gyeongsangbuk-do, central South Korea
 Apo Island, a volcanic island in the Philippines
 Apo (island), a coral reef island in the Philippines
 Lake Apo is a crater lake in Barangay Guinoyoran in the city of Valencia in Bukidnon province in the Philippines
 Karaš River or Apo, a tributary of the Danube in the Banat region of Serbia and Romania
 Mount Apo, a stratovolcano on the island of Mindanao in the Philippines
 Antonio Roldán Betancourt Airport IATA code, Apartadó, Columbia

Businesses and organizations 
 African Political Organization, a Coloured political organization in early twentieth century South Africa
 Alpha Phi Omega, a U.S. service fraternity
 Alpha Psi Omega, a U.S. honors theatre society
 Analysis & Policy Observatory (APO) (formerly Australian Policy Online), a digital library of policy and practice resources
 Apotex, Canadian pharmaceutical company, producer of generic drugs
 Association for Professional Observers, an association of fisheries observers
 , a political protest movement in West Germany during the 1960s and 1970s

Other 
 Acting Pilot Officer, the lowest commissioned grade in the Royal Air Force
 Acute pulmonary oedema, fluid accumulation on the lungs
 Apo (drink), an alcoholic beverage of Northeast India
 Apo, a god of mountains in Inca mythology
 Apochromat, a type of photographic or other lens
 Apoprotein (disambiguation), a protein without its bound cofactor
 Army Post Office: chiefly U.S. Army and U.S. Air Force postal facilities
 Authorized Personnel Only, a fictional black ops unit on Alias
 Alternative Public Offering
 Apo, along with Datu, one of the traditional Philippine titles of nobility; meaning "elder"

See also 
 Apolipoprotein, lipid-binding protein
 APU (disambiguation)